Brian Alexis Ocampo Ferreira (born 25 June 1999) is a Uruguayan professional footballer who plays as a forward for La Liga club Cádiz and the Uruguay national team.

Club career

Nacional Montevideo
A youth academy graduate of Nacional, Ocampo was part of club's under-20 team which won 2018 U-20 Copa Libertadores. He made his professional debut on 19 July 2018 in a goalless draw against Sol de América in second stage of Copa Sudamericana. Four days later on 23 July, he made his league debut in a 3–2 win against Montevideo City Torque.

Cádiz
On 28 August 2022, Spanish La Liga side Cádiz reached an agreement with Nacional for the transfer of Ocampo. He scored his first competitive goal for the club on 16 January 2023, scoring the opener in a 1–1 draw with Elche.

International career
Ocampo is a former Uruguayan youth international. On 1 June 2021, he received first call-up to senior team as a replacement for Giorgian de Arrascaeta in their 2021 Copa América squad. He made his debut on 18 June 2021 in a 1–0 loss against Argentina. On 21 October 2022, he was named in Uruguay's 55-man preliminary squad for the 2022 FIFA World Cup.

Career statistics

Club

International

Honours
Nacional
Uruguayan Primera División: 2019, 2020, 2022
Supercopa Uruguaya: 2021

Nacional U20
U-20 Copa Libertadores: 2018

Uruguay U20
 South American Games silver medal: 2018

References

External links
Profile at Nacional Official Website

1999 births
Living people
Association football forwards
Uruguayan footballers
Uruguay youth international footballers
Uruguay under-20 international footballers
Uruguay international footballers
Club Nacional de Football players
Cádiz CF players
Uruguayan Primera División players
La Liga players
2021 Copa América players
South American Games silver medalists for Uruguay
South American Games medalists in football
Uruguayan expatriate footballers
Uruguayan expatriate sportspeople in Spain
Expatriate footballers in Spain